Suicide is a crime in some parts of the world. However, while suicide has been decriminalized in many western countries, the act is stigmatized and discouraged. In other contexts, suicide could be utilized as an extreme expression of liberty, as is exemplified by its usage as an expression of devout dissent towards perceived tyranny or injustice which occurred occasionally in cultures like ancient Rome, medieval Japan, or today's Chinese Tibet.

While a person who has died of suicide is beyond the reach of the law, there can still be legal consequences in relation to treatment of the corpse or the fate of the person's property or family members. The associated matters of assisting a suicide and attempting suicide have also been dealt with by the laws of some jurisdictions. Some countries criminalise suicide attempts.

History
In ancient Athens, a person who had died of suicide (without the approval of the state) was denied the honours of a normal burial. The person would be buried alone, on the outskirts of the city, without a headstone or marker. A criminal ordinance issued by Louis XIV in 1670 was far more severe in its punishment: the dead person's body was drawn through the streets, face down, and then hung or thrown on a garbage heap. Additionally, all of the person's property was confiscated.

The 'Burial of Suicide Act' of 1823 abolished the legal requirement in England of burying suicides at crossroads.

Assisted suicide

In many jurisdictions it is a crime to assist others, directly or indirectly, in taking their own lives. In some jurisdictions, it is also illegal to encourage them to do so. Sometimes an exception applies for physician assisted suicide (PAS), under strict conditions.

Laws in individual jurisdictions (table)

Africa

Americas

Asia

Europe

Oceania

Laws in individual jurisdictions

Australia

Victoria 
In the Australian state of Victoria, while suicide itself is no longer a crime, a survivor of a suicide pact can be charged with manslaughter rather than murder if they killed the deceased party. Also, it is a crime to counsel, incite, or aid and abet another in attempting suicide, and the law explicitly allows any person to use "such force as may reasonably be necessary" to prevent another from committing suicide.

On 29 November 2017 the state of Victoria passed the Voluntary Assisted Dying Act, making it legal for a doctor to assist a terminally ill patient with less than six months to live to end their own life. The law came into effect on 19 June 2019.

Queensland 
On 17 September 2021 the state of Queensland passed the Voluntary Assisted Dying Act 2021. The law will come into effect on 1 January 2023.

Legislation decriminalizing suicide in Australian States and Territories

Canada

The common-law crimes of attempting suicide and of assisting suicide were codified in Canada when Parliament enacted the Criminal Code in 1892. It carried a maximum penalty of 2 years' imprisonment. Eighty years later, in 1972, Parliament repealed the offence of attempting suicide from the Criminal Code based on the argument that a legal deterrent was unnecessary. The prohibition on assisting suicide remained, as s 241 of the Criminal Code:

Counselling or aiding suicide
241. Every one who

(a) counsels a person to commit suicide, or

(b) aids or abets a person to commit suicide,

 whether suicide ensues or not, is guilty of an indictable offence and liable to imprisonment for a term not exceeding fourteen years.

However, the law against assisted suicide, including physician-assisted suicide, was the subject of much debate including two reports of the Law Reform Commission of Canada in 1982 and 1983, though these did not support changing the law.

In 1993, the offence of assisted suicide survived a constitutional challenge in the Supreme Court of Canada, in the case of Rodriguez v. British Columbia (Attorney General). The plaintiff, Sue Rodriguez, had been diagnosed with amyotrophic lateral sclerosis (ALS) in early 1991. She wished to be able to die of suicide at a time of her own choosing but would require assistance to do so because her physical condition prevented her from doing so without assistance. By a 5-4 majority, the Court held that the prohibition on assisted suicide did not infringe s 7 of the Canadian Charter of RIghts and Freedoms, which provides constitutional protection for liberty and security of the person. The majority held that while the law did affect those rights, it did so in a manner consistent with the principles of fundamental justice. The majority also held that the prohibition on assisted suicide did not infringe the Charter's prohibition against cruel and unusual treatment or punishment. Assuming the prohibition did discriminate on basis of disability, the majority held that the infringement was a justifiable restriction.

In 1995 the Senate issued a report on assisted suicide entitled Of Life and Death. In 2011 the Royal Society of Canada published its report on end-of-life decision-making. In the report it recommended that the Criminal Code be modified so as to permit assistance in dying under some circumstances. In 2012 a Select Committee on Dying with Dignity of the Quebec National Assembly produced a report recommending amendments to legislation to recognize medical aid in dying as being an appropriate component of end-of-life care. That report resulted in An Act respecting end-of-life care, which is set to come into force on December 10, 2015.

On June 15, 2012, in Carter v Canada (AG), the British Columbia Supreme Court ruled that the criminal offence prohibiting physician assistance of suicide was unconstitutional on the grounds that denying people access to assisted suicide in hard cases was contrary to the Charter of Rights and Freedoms guarantee of equality under Section 15.
This decision was subsequently overturned by the majority of the British Columbia Court of Appeal (2:1) on the basis that the issue had already been decided by the Supreme Court of Canada in the Rodriguez case, invoking stare decisis.

A landmark Supreme Court of Canada decision on February 6, 2015 overturned the 1993 Rodriguez decision that had ruled against this method of dying. The unanimous decision 
in the further appeal of Carter v Canada (AG), stated that a total prohibition of physician-assisted death is unconstitutional. The court's ruling limits exculpation of physicians engaging physician-assisted death to hard cases of "a competent adult person who clearly consents to the termination of life and has a grievous and irremediable medical condition, including an illness, disease or disability, that causes enduring suffering that is intolerable to the individual in the circumstances of his or her condition." The ruling was suspended for 12 months to allow the Canadian parliament to draft a new, constitutional law to replace the existing one.

Specifically, the Supreme Court held that the current legislation was overbroad in that it prohibits "physician‑assisted death for a competent adult person who (1) clearly consents to the termination of life and (2) has a grievous and irremediable medical condition (including an illness, disease or disability) that causes enduring suffering that is intolerable to the individual in the circumstances of his or her condition." The court decision includes a requirement that there must be stringent limits that are "scrupulously monitored." This will require the death certificate to be completed by an independent medical examiner, not the treating physician, to ensure the accuracy of reporting the cause of death.

The newly (November 2015) elected federal government subsequently requested a six-month extension for implementation; the arguments for this request were scheduled to be heard by the Supreme Court in January 2016.

The Canadian Medical Association (CMA) reported that not all doctors would be willing to help a patient die. The belief in late 2015 was that no physician would be forced to do so. The CMA was already offering educational sessions to members as to the process that would be used after the legislation had been implemented.

India
The Indian penal code 309 deals with punishment for attempted suicide. The Mental Health Care Act 2017 greatly limits the scope for the code to be implemented. The bill states, "Any person who attempts to commit suicide shall be presumed, unless proved otherwise, to have severe stress and shall not be tried and punished under the said Code". State governments are required to provide adequate care and rehabilitation for such individuals as to prevent a recurrence of an attempt to suicide.

Iran
The act of suicide has not been criminalized in the penal law of the Islamic Republic of Iran. However, no one is allowed to ask another to kill him/her. In addition, threatening to kill oneself is not an offense by the law, however if this act of threatening is done by a prisoner in a prison, then that would be considered as violation of the prisons' regulations and the offender may be punished according to penal law.

According to the Act. 836 of the civil law of the Islamic Republic of Iran if a suicidal person prepares for suicide and writes a testament, if he/she dies, then by law the will is considered void and if he/she doesn't die, then the will is officially accepted and can be carried out.

According to the theory of "borrowed crime", because suicide itself is not a crime in penal law, thus any type of assisting in an individual's suicide is not considered a crime and the assistant is not punished. Assisting in suicide is considered a crime only when it becomes the "cause" of the suicidal person's death; for example when someone takes advantage of someone else's unawareness or simplicity and convince him/her to kill him/herself. In such cases assisting in suicide is treated as murder and the offender is punished accordingly. In addition, assisting in suicide is considered a crime under section 2 of the Act. 15 of the cyber crimes law of the Islamic Republic of Iran which was legislated on June 15, 2009. According to the mentioned act, any type of encouragement, stimulation, invitation, simplification of access to lethal substances and/or methods and teaching of suicide with the help of computer or any other media network is considered assisting in suicide and thus, is punished by imprisonment from 91 days up to 1 year or fines from 5 to 20 million Iranian Rials or both.

Ireland
Attempted suicide is not a criminal offence in Ireland and, under Irish law, self-harm is not generally seen as a form of attempted suicide. It was decriminalised in 1993. Assisted suicide and euthanasia are illegal. This is currently being challenged at the High Court, as of December 2012. As of 2014 assisted suicide remains illegal in Ireland.

Malaysia
Under section 309 of the Penal Code of Malaysia, whoever attempts to commit suicide, and does any act
towards the commission of such offence, shall be punished with imprisonment for a term which may extend to one year or with fine
or with both.

Netherlands
In the Netherlands, being present and giving moral support during someone's suicide is not a crime; neither is supplying general information on suicide techniques. However, it is a crime to participate in the preparation for or execution of a suicide, including supplying lethal means or instruction in their use. (Physician-assisted suicide may be an exception. See Euthanasia in the Netherlands.)

New Zealand
As with many other western societies, New Zealand has, since the 1961 Crimes Act, had no laws against suicide in itself, as a personal and unassisted act. Assisted suicide and voluntary euthanasia will be legal in certain circumstances as from November 2021. (For further details, see Euthanasia in New Zealand.)

Norway
Suicide or attempted suicide is not illegal in Norway. However, complicity is.

Romania
Suicide itself is not illegal in Romania, however encouraging or facilitating the suicide of another person is a criminal offense and is punishable by up to 7, 10 or 20 years in prison, depending on circumstances.

Russian Federation
In Russia, a person whose mental disorder "poses a direct danger to themself" can be put into a psychiatric hospital. In addition, after hospitalization in a psychiatric hospital, such a citizen of the Russian Federation may be subject to medical restrictions in the form of a driver's license or non-admission to obtain them, as well as such citizens are not allowed to serve in the army, police and other law enforcement agencies and many other restrictions on employment.

In practice, this happens as follows: A failed suicider, detained by the police, for example, is taken to the department, then a psychiatric ambulance is called, a psychiatrist on duty who arrives at the scene decides whether a citizen detained by the police needs hospitalization. In case of hospitalization in a psychiatric hospital, the patient is placed in a ward of enhanced supervision for the first three days, then transferred to the suicidology department. In most cases, such citizens are kept in hospital for no more than one month, in rare cases longer, but very rarely they are discharged less than a month after hospitalization.

Incitement to suicide:

Inciting someone to suicide by threats, cruel treatment, or systematic humiliation is punishable by up to 5 years in prison. (Article 110 of the Criminal Code of the Russian Federation)

Federal law of Russian Federation no. 139-FZ of 2012-07-28 prescribes censorship of information about methods of suicide on the Internet. According to a website created by the Pirate Party of Russia, some pages with suicide jokes have been blacklisted, which may have led to blocking of an IP address of Wikia. See also: Dumb Ways to Die#Censorship in Russia.

Singapore
Suicide has been decriminalised since 5 May 2019, with the passing of the Criminal Law Reform Act, which repealed Section 309 of the Singapore Penal Code. The law took effect on 1 January 2020.

South Africa
South African courts, including the Appellate Division, have ruled that suicide and attempted suicide are not crimes under the Roman-Dutch law, or that if they ever were crimes, they have been abrogated by disuse. Attempted suicide was from 1886 to 1968 a crime in the Transkei under the Transkeian Territories Penal Code.

United Kingdom

England, Wales and Northern Ireland
Suicide was never a statutory criminal offence. English common law perceived suicide as an immoral, criminal offence against God and also against the Crown. The common law offence of felo de se was used to punish people who had attempted suicide and their surviving relatives. A person who had died by suicide could have been denied burial, or their estate forfeited to the Crown, while survivors of suicide attempts could be punished by imprisonment or death. Posthumous punishment stopped in the 19th century, and appetite for punishing survivors of suicide attempts waned until this was decriminalised by the passing of the Suicide Act 1961 and the Criminal Justice Act (Northern Ireland) 1966; these same acts made it an offence to assist in a suicide.

With respect to civil law the simple act of suicide is lawful but the consequences of dying by suicide might turn an individual event into an unlawful act, as in the case of Reeves v Commissioners of Police of the Metropolis [2000] 1 AC 360, where a man in police custody hanged himself and was held equally liable with the police (a cell door defect enabled the hanging) for the loss suffered by his widow; the practical effect was to reduce the police damages liability by 50%. In 2009, the House of Lords ruled that the law concerning the treatment of people who accompanied those who died of assisted suicide was unclear, following Debbie Purdy's case that this lack of clarity was a breach of her human rights. (In her case, as someone with multiple sclerosis, she wanted to know whether her husband would be prosecuted for accompanying her abroad where she might eventually wish to die of assisted suicide, if her illness progressed.)

Scotland
Suicide was never a statutory criminal offence. Under Scots Law, survivors of suicide attempts may be arrested and prosecuted for associated common law offences such as breach of the peace or culpable and reckless conduct. Although the Scottish Government has never legislated to formally decriminalise suicide, a 2009 Appeal Court case, which found that a breach of the peace must have an element of disruption to the community, substantially reduced the likelihood of securing a successful prosecution for suicide attempts. Subsequently the Crown Office and Procurator Fiscal Service instructed Police Scotland to deal with cases of attempted suicide which come to their notice by means other than arrest, even where an offence such as breach of the peace may have been committed. Police Scotland has advised officers:  Despite these recommendations, occasional arrests and prosecutions for suicide attempts continue. Consequential liability upon a person attempting suicide (or if dead, his/her estate) might arise under civil law where it parallels the civil liabilities recognised in the (English Law) Reeves case mentioned above.

Assisting a suicide in Scotland can in some circumstances constitute murder, culpable homicide, or no offence depending upon the facts of each case. No modern examples of cases devoid of direct application of intentional or unintentional harm (such as helping a person to inject themselves) seem to be available; it was noted in a consultation preceding the introduction of the Assisted Suicide (Scotland) Bill that "the law appears to be subject to some uncertainty, partly because of a lack of relevant case law".

United States
In the United States of America, some topics are determined by federal law whereas others differ across states. The information on suicide prevention legislation will be discussed at the federal level first and will be followed by those states that have some form of legislation.

Historically, various states listed the act of suicide as a felony, but these policies were sparsely enforced. In the late 1960s, 18 U.S. states had no laws against suicide. By the late 1980s, 30 of the 50 states had no laws against suicide or suicide attempts, but every state had laws declaring it to be a felony to aid, advise, or encourage another person to suicide. By the early 1990s only two states still listed suicide as a crime, and these have since removed that classification. In some U.S. states, suicide is still considered an unwritten "common law crime," as stated in Blackstone's Commentaries. (So held the Virginia Supreme Court in 1992. Wackwitz v. Roy, 418 S.E.2d 861 (Va. 1992)). As a common law crime, suicide can bar recovery for the late suicidal person's family in a lawsuit unless the suicidal person can be proven to have been "of unsound mind." That is, the suicide must be proven to have been an involuntary act of the victim in order for the family to be awarded monetary damages by the court. This can occur when the family of the deceased sues the caregiver (perhaps a jail or hospital) for negligence in failing to provide appropriate care. Some American legal scholars look at the issue as one of personal liberty. According to Nadine Strossen, former President of the ACLU, "The idea of government making determinations about how you end your life, forcing you...could be considered cruel and unusual punishment in certain circumstances, and Justice Stevens in a very interesting opinion in a right-to-die [case] raised the analogy."
Physician-assisted suicide is legal in some states. For the terminally ill, it is legal in the state of Oregon under the Oregon Death with Dignity Act. In Washington state, it became legal in 2009, when a law modeled after the Oregon act, the Washington Death with Dignity Act was passed. A patient must be diagnosed as having less than six months to live, be of sound mind, make a request orally and in writing, have it approved by two different doctors, then wait 15 days and make the request again. A doctor may prescribe a lethal dose of a medication but may not administer it.

In California, medical facilities are empowered or required to commit anyone whom they believe to be suicidal for evaluation and treatment.

In Maryland, it is an open question as to whether suicide is illegal. In 2018, a Maryland man was convicted of attempted suicide.

In New York State in 1917, while suicide was "a grave public wrong", an attempt to commit suicide was a felony, punishable by a maximum penalty of two years' imprisonment.

Federal legislation 
Back in 2004, Congress passed the Garrett  Lee Smith Memorial Act (GLSMA) . The GLSMA made federal funding available for the first time to states, tribes, and colleges across the nation to implement community-based youth and young adult suicide prevention programs. Many of these programs had goals based on the National Suicide Prevention Strategy that was designed in 2001, including increased community-based prevention and stigma reduction among others.

In October 2020, the National Suicide Hotline Designation Act came into effect. This law states that there was to be a transition from a 10-digit hotline number to a universal 3-digit hotline number, which should be familiar and recognizable to everyone. On top of that, in May 2021, the Suicide Prevention Act has passed the House, and is currently being considered by the Senate. This Act will authorize a pilot program to intensify surveillance of self-harm and establish a grant program to provide more self-harm and suicide prevention services across the country.

On July 16th 2022, the United States transitioned the National Suicide Hotline from the former 10-digit number into the 988 Suicide & Crisis Lifeline, linking both the National Suicide Hotline, the Veterans Crisis Line, and a network of more than 200 state and local call centers run through SAMHSA, the Substance Abuse and Mental Health Services Administration.

California 
The State of California has introduced several bills related to suicide over the last couple of years, most of which are related to youth. In 2016, Assembly Bill 2246 was passed, which required school districts to have a suicide prevention policy that addresses the needs of their highest-risk pupils in grades 7 to 12. Since then, the Bill has been amended twice. First, in 2018, AB 2639 was passed, which required school districts to update their policy once every five years. Then, in 2019, AB 1767 was passed. Because of this amendment, districts serving kindergarten to 6th grade will also have to have a suicide prevention policy.

Lastly, also in 2019, the governor signed AB 984. This Bill allows people to send their excess tax payments to a special Suicide Prevention Fund. This fund is supposed to award grants and help fund crisis centers.

Utah 
The State of Utah has so far passed the most bills relating to suicide prevention, with a total of 21 suicide-related bills. A large number of these bills have been for school-based suicide prevention, including suicide prevention training for all school staff (HB 501), grant awards for programs in elementary schools to increase peer-to-peer suicide prevention (HB 346), and an expanded scope to specifically include the suicide risk of youth not accepted by family, especially LGBTQ-youth (HB 393). Other bills have included topics such as increased attention for suicide prevention in substance use treatment (HB 346), bereavement services (HB 336), and suicide prevention programs related to firearm use (HB 17). Moreover, the Utah Division of Substance Abuse and Mental Health (DSAMH) has Zero Suicides as one of their policies, using this as a framework to guide their actions.

See also
Legality of euthanasia
State-assisted suicide
Suicide prevention

References

External links
 Large Europe majorities for assisted suicide: survey
 Should suicide be legal? - Wikidebate at Wikiversity
 Abetment to Suicide

Legislation
Statutory law